Alberto Guzmán Soriano (19 February 1923 – 11 November 1989) was foreign minister of Bolivia ("chancellor") from 1973 to 1976 under President Hugo Banzer.

References

1923 births
1989 deaths
Foreign ministers of Bolivia